Dilshod Yarbekov (born May 1, 1974 in Samarqand) is an Uzbek boxer, who has won medals at the Asian and World Championships in the middleweight category. He is an Honored Sportsman of the Republic of Uzbekistan.

Achievements
1994 – Asian Games — Bronze Medal
1995 – World Amateur Boxing Championships — Bronze Medal
1996 – Central Asian Games — Gold Medal
1998 – Asian Games — Silver Medal

At the 2000 Summer Olympics he lost in the first round to Felix Sturm (GER, fighting under his birthname A.Catic)

References
Ministry of Cultural and Sports Affairs of Uzbekistan
sports-reference

1974 births
People from Samarkand
Boxers at the 1996 Summer Olympics
Boxers at the 2000 Summer Olympics
Living people
Olympic boxers of Uzbekistan
Asian Games medalists in boxing
Boxers at the 1994 Asian Games
Boxers at the 1998 Asian Games
Uzbekistani male boxers
AIBA World Boxing Championships medalists
Asian Games silver medalists for Uzbekistan
Asian Games bronze medalists for Uzbekistan
Medalists at the 1994 Asian Games
Medalists at the 1998 Asian Games
Middleweight boxers
20th-century Uzbekistani people